Tavelsjö is a locality situated in Umeå Municipality, Västerbotten County, Sweden with 245 inhabitants in 2010. It is located between Umeå and Vindeln, at the north end of the lake Tavelsjön. Tavelsjö church was consecrated in 1965.

References

External links
Tavelsjö ByaNät 

Populated places in Umeå Municipality